Lighthizer is a surname. Notable people with the surname include:

 O. James Lighthizer (born 1946), American lawyer and politician
 Robert Lighthizer (born 1947), American lawyer and the eighteenth United States Trade Representative

de:Lighthizer